Rianna Leigh Mizzen (born 8 December 1999) is an Australian former artistic gymnast. She was a member of the teams that won bronze medals at the 2018 Commonwealth Games and the 2016 Pacific Rim Championships. She is the 2016 Australian all-around champion and a three-time Australian champion on the uneven bars.

Early life 
Rianna Mizzen was born on 8 December 1999 in Grafton, New South Wales. She began gymnastics when she was six years old, and she began training at the Gymnastics Queensland High Performance Centre when she was nine.

Junior career 
Mizzen made her international debut at the 2013 Australian Youth Olympic Festival and helped Australia win the team bronze behind China and Great Britain. Then at the 2013 Australian Championships, she placed sixth in the all-around and won the bronze medal on the uneven bars.

At the 2014 Australian Championships, Mizzen finished eighth in the all-around and fifth on the uneven bars. She then went to the Elite Gym Massilia in Marseille and placed tenth with the Australian team and thirtieth in the all-around.

Senior career

2015-2016 
Mizzen won the gold medal on the uneven bars at the 2015 Australian Championships. She then made her senior international debut at a friendly meet against China and placed seventh on the uneven bars.

Mizzen was selected to represent Australia at the 2016 Olympic Test Event alongside Georgia-Rose Brown, Emily Little, Larrissa Miller, Kiara Munteanu, and Emily Whitehead to try and qualify Australia a team spot for the 2016 Olympic Games. The same team competed at the Pacific Rim Championships to prepare for the Test Event, and they won the bronze medal behind the United States and Canada. At the Test Event, the team finished in fifth place and did not qualify a full Olympic team. At the Australian Championships, she won the gold medal in the all-around and on the uneven bars. However, she was not selected for Australia's sole Olympic spot. She won the gold medal on the uneven bars at the Anadia World Challenge Cup.

2017 
Mizzen won the bronze medal on the uneven bars at the Melbourne World Cup behind Chinese gymnasts Liu Tingting and Luo Huan. She then went to Montreal for the International Gymnix and placed ninth in the all-around and sixth on the floor exercise. She also won the bronze medal on the uneven bars behind Hitomi Hatakeda and Jade Chrobok. Then at the Baku World Cup, she won the silver medal on the uneven bars behind Diana Varinska. She then finished fifth on the uneven bars at the Doha World Cup. At the Australian Championships, she won the bronze medal in the all-around behind Emily Little and Georgia-Rose Brown. She also won the gold medal on the uneven bars, placed seventh on the balance beam and won the bronze medal on the floor exercise. She was selected to compete at the World Championships, but she did not qualify for any finals.

2018 

Mizzen competed at the Melbourne World Cup and finished eighth on the uneven bars. She was selected to represent Australia at the 2018 Commonwealth Games alongside Georgia-Rose Brown, Alexandra Eade, Georgia Godwin, and Emily Whitehead. Mizzen and Godwin were both sick at the training camp immediately prior to the Games, but they recovered and were still able to compete. The team won the bronze medal behind England and Canada. At the Australian Championships, she won the bronze medal in the all-around behind Georgia Godwin and Emily Whitehead, and she won the silver medal on the uneven bars behind Godwin. Then at the Australian Classic, she won the silver medal in the all-around behind Georgia-Rose Brown and the gold medal on the uneven bars. She was initially selected to compete at the World Championships, but she tore her ACL and withdrew.

Retirement 
Mizzen announced her retirement from gymnastics on 16 October 2019 due to not being able to recover from her knee injury. She now works as a gymnastics coach in Brisbane.

In 2020, Mizzen spoke out against the culture at Gymnastics Australia and explained that her injury before the 2018 World Championships was a result of being overworked and the gymnasts not being listened to when they told coaches they were exhausted.

Competitive history

References

External links
 

1999 births
Living people
Australian female artistic gymnasts
Gymnasts at the 2018 Commonwealth Games
Commonwealth Games medallists in gymnastics
Commonwealth Games bronze medallists for Australia
People from Grafton, New South Wales
Sportswomen from New South Wales
21st-century Australian women
Medallists at the 2018 Commonwealth Games